Esports will be one of the 37 sports to be played at the 2022 Asian Games to be held in Hangzhou, China from 23 September 2023 to 8 October 2023. This will be first occasion where Esports will be an official medal event at Asian Games and the third time in a Multi-sport event with last being in 2019 Southeast Asian Games in the Philippines and 2021 Southeast Asian Games in Vietnam. At the 2018 Asian Games held in Jakarta, Indonesia, five games were included as demonstration titles. In 2022, there will be total of 8 medal events and 2 demonstration events.

Events
Esports were featured at the 2018 Asian Games as a demonstration sport, thus medals won in the sport would not be counted in the official overall medal tally. With the 2022 Asian Games, a total of 8 medal event in esports and 2 demonstration events in robotics and VR. Esports will be in the intellectual titles category.

AliSports, the sports arm of Chinese multinational technology company,  Alibaba Group, has partnered with the Olympic Council of Asia to bring esports to the Asian Games.

List

Medal Events
PUBG Mobile (Asian Games version)
Dota 2
Hearthstone
League of Legends
Dream Three Kingdoms 2
FIFA
Street Fighter V
Arena of Valor (Asian Games version)

Demonstration Events
AESF Robot Masters
AESF VR Sports

Venue

All esports games at the 2022 Asian Games will be played at the Xiacheng District Esports Venue.

The stadium started the construction on September 24, 2020, and was officially powered up on March 15, 2022. It has an area of 80,000 m2 (approximately 50 sq mi) and will have a total of 4,087 seats.

References

2022 Asian Games events
2022 in esports
2022